Charles Cullum (8 March 18991979) was a British stage and film actor.

On 29 December 1930 Mary Ellen Chaddock, a popular British magazine model, reportedly committed suicide after learning Cullum had married in New York. At the time he was touring the United States playing Captain Stanhope in the British war drama Journey's End. Cullum would later state that there was never a hint of engagement between him and Chaddock.

Filmography

References

Bibliography
 Ian Christie & Andrew Moor. Michael Powell: International Perspectives on an English Film-maker. British Film Institute, 2005.

External links

1899 births
1979 deaths
British male film actors
British male stage actors
British male television actors